Ancilla ampla is a species of sea snail, a marine gastropod mollusk in the family Ancillariidae.

There exist two subspecies:
 Ancilla ampla ampla (Gmelin, 1791)
 Ancilla ampla cylindrica (G.B. Sowerby II, 1859)

Description

Distribution

References

External links

ampla
Gastropods described in 1791
Taxa named by Johann Friedrich Gmelin